Chippin' Away can refer to:
Album
 Chippin' Away, a 2011 music album of Kevin Fowler
Songs
 "Chippin' Away", a song by Night Ranger from Midnight Madness
 "Chippin' Away", a song by Corey Hart from Young Man Running
 "Chippin' Away", a song by Graham Nash